Rosaschi Air Park  is a public use airport owned by the U.S. Bureau of Land Management and located two nautical miles (4 km) north of the central business district of Smith, in Lyon County, Nevada, United States.

Facilities and aircraft 
Rosaschi Air Park covers an area of 482 acres (195 ha) at an elevation of 4,809 feet (1,466 m) above mean sea level. It has two runways: 7/25 is 4,800 by 32 feet (1,463 x 10 m) with an asphalt surface and 17/35 is 3,700 by 64 feet (1,128 x 20 m) with a dirt surface.

For the 12-month period ending June 30, 2009, the airport had 5,840 aircraft operations, an average of 16 per day: 99.7% general aviation and 0.3% military.
At that time 10 aircraft were based here: 70% single-engine, 20% ultralight, and 10% multi-engine.

See also 
 List of airports in Nevada

References

External links 
  from Nevada DOT
 Aerial image as of September 1999 from USGS The National Map
 

Airports in Nevada
Transportation in Lyon County, Nevada
Buildings and structures in Lyon County, Nevada
Bureau of Land Management